Jacques Daroy (1896–1963) was a French screenwriter and film director. He directed the historical crime film Vidocq in 1939.

Selected filmography

Director
 Vidocq (1939)
 Raboliot (1946)
Rumours (1947)
 Inspector Sergil (1947)
 The Passenger (1949)
 Oriental Port (1950)
 Monsieur Scrupule, Gangster (1953)

References

Bibliography
 Crisp, C.G. The Classic French Cinema, 1930-1960. Indiana University Press, 1993.

External links

1896 births
1963 deaths
French film directors